Cooroy Mountain is a rural locality in the Shire of Noosa, Queensland, Australia.

History
Cooroy Mountain's name came from Mount Cooroy, which was originally called Coorooey, from the Aboriginal word for possum, kurui.

Kuri'bigil'ba is the name of Cooroy Mountain in the dialect of the Kabi speaking aboriginal peoples of this area. It means the place where the Sun God came down to Dha (Earth). It is believed the mountain turned yellow once a year due to the flowering of an unknown tree. Most likely due to the endemic silky oak tree (Grevillea robusta) which has glabrous yellowish orange flowers from around September to November.

Between 2008 and 2013, Cooroy Mountain was within Sunshine Coast Region, due to an enforced amalgamation of local government areas that was subsequently reversed.

Traditional owners
The Kabi Kabi people and language group are not extinct although they may no longer be present in the local area of Cooroy mountain as a result of having been moved out of the area as a result of government policies in the past.

References

Suburbs of Noosa Shire, Queensland
Localities in Queensland